Liane M. Rossi is a Brazilian chemist who is a Professor of Inorganic Chemistry at the University of São Paulo. Her research considers nanomaterials and catalysis. She serves on the editorial boards of ChemistrySelect, ACS Catalysis and ACS Sustainable Chemistry & Engineering.

Education 
Rossi earned her undergraduate degree in chemical engineering at the Federal University of Rio Grande do Sul. She moved to the Federal University of Santa Catarina for her graduate research. She returned to the Federal University of Rio Grande do Sul, where she spent two years as a postdoc, before moving to the University of New Orleans.

Research and career 
In 2004, Rossi returned to Brazil, joining the Institute of Chemistry at the University of São Paulo. She was promoted to full Professor in 2016. Her research considers catalysis, green chemistry and the development of nanomaterials. She was particularly interested in hydrogenation, oxidation and the conversion of biomass into useful chemicals. 

Rossi is particularly interested in carbon dioxide conversion, and she coordinates the São Paulo Research Foundation–Shell programme Innovative process for CO2 conversion to high added value chemicals and fuels based on hybrid catalysts. Rossi has explored the creation of metallic nanoparticles for heterogeneous catalysis.

Rossi serves on the Editorial Boards of ChemistrySelect, ACS Catalysis and ACS Sustainable Chemistry & Engineering. She documented the challenges in leading a laboratory and teaching students in Brazil during the  COVID-19 pandemic. As internet access in Brazil is patchy, students struggled to attend online classes, and the high number of COVID-19 cases made returning to in-person research difficult.

Selected publications

Personal life 
Rossi is married to a chemist.

References 

Brazilian chemists
Brazilian women scientists
Academic staff of the University of São Paulo
Federal University of Santa Catarina alumni
Federal University of Rio Grande do Sul alumni
Academic journal editors
Year of birth missing (living people)
Living people